The 1997 Atlantic 10 men's basketball tournament was played from March 5 to March 8, 1997. The tournament was played at the Spectrum in Philadelphia, Pennsylvania.  The winner was named champion of the Atlantic 10 Conference and received an automatic bid to the 1997 NCAA Men's Division I Basketball Tournament. Saint Joseph's University won the tournament. Massachusetts' second round loss to George Washington was their first loss in the conference tournament since 1991. Massachusetts, Rhode Island, Temple, and Xavier also received bids to the NCAA Tournament. Rashid Bey of Saint Joseph's was named the tournament's Most Outstanding Player. Future NBA player Tyson Wheeler of Rhode Island was among those also named to the All-Championship Team.  The top two teams in each division received a first-round bye.

Bracket

All games played at The Spectrum, Philadelphia, Pennsylvania* - Overtime

Atlantic 10 men's basketball tournament
Tournament
Atlantic 10 men's basketball tournament
Atlantic 10 men's basketball tournament
Sports in Philadelphia